Reformist Party may refer to:

Enlightenment Party, a defunct political party in Korea
Kaishintō, a defunct political party in Japan
Kakushintō, a defunct political party in Japan
Reformist Party (Portugal), a defunct political party in Portugal (1920s)
Reformist Party (Portugal, 1868), a defunct political party in Portugal (1868–1876)
Reformist Party (Serbia), a minor political party in Serbia
Reformist Party (Spain), a defunct political party in Spain
Reformist Party ORA, a defunct political party in Kosovo

See also
 Reform Party (disambiguation)